Bartın District (also: Merkez, meaning "central") is a district of the Bartın Province of Turkey. Its seat is the city Bartın. Its area is 1,091 km2, and its population is 159,811 (2021).

Composition
There are three municipalities in Bartın District:
 Bartın
 Hasankadı
 Kozcağız

There are 134 villages in Bartın District:

 Ahmetpaşa
 Akağaç
 Akbaba
 Akbaş
 Akçalı
 Akçamescit
 Akgöz
 Akıncılar
 Akmanlar
 Akpınar
 Alibaş
 Arıönü
 Arıt
 Aşağıdere
 Avgölü
 Aydınlar
 Bakioğlu
 Balat
 Barkaçboz
 Başoğlu
 Bayıryüzü
 Bedil
 Beşköprü
 Budakdüzü
 Büyükkıran
 Büyükkızılkum
 Çakırdemirci
 Çakırkadı
 Çakırömerağa
 Çamaltı
 Çamlık
 Çaybükü
 Çayır
 Celilbeyoğlu
 Çeştepe
 Çiftlikköy
 Cöcü
 Çöpbey
 Çukurbük
 Dallıca
 Darıören
 Derbent
 Dırazlar
 Doğaşı
 Ecikler
 Ellibaş
 Epçiler
 Epçilerkadı
 Esbey
 Esenyurt
 Eskiemirler
 Eskihamidiye
 Eyüpoğlu
 Fırınlı
 Gençali
 Geriş
 Gerişkatırcı
 Gökçekıran
 Gözpınar
 Gürpınar
 Güzelcehisar
 Hacıhatipoğlu
 Hacıosmanoğlu
 Hanyeri
 Hasanefendi
 Hasanlar
 Hatipler
 Hıdırlar
 Hocaoğlu
 İmamlar
 Kabagöz
 Kaman
 Karacaoğlu
 Karahüseyinli
 Karainler
 Karaköyşeyhler
 Karamazak
 Karasu
 Karayakup
 Karşıyaka
 Kaşbaşı
 Kayacılar
 Kayadibi
 Kayadibiçavuş
 Kayadibikavlak
 Kışlaköy
 Kızılelma
 Kocareis
 Köyyeri
 Küçükkızılkum
 Kumaçorak
 Kümesler
 Kurt
 Kutlubeydemirci
 Kutlubeytabaklar
 Kutlubeyyazıcılar
 Mamak
 Mekeçler
 Muratbey
 Okçular
 Ören
 Özbaşı
 Şabankadı
 Şahin
 Şahne
 Saraylı
 Şarköy
 Serdar
 Sipahiler
 Şiremirtabaklar
 Şirinköy
 Sofular
 Söğütlü
 Sülek
 Sütlüce
 Tabanözü
 Tasmacı
 Terkehaliller
 Terkehatipler
 Topluca
 Turanlar
 Tuzcular
 Uğurlar
 Ulugeçitambarcı
 Ulugeçitkadı
 Uluköy
 Ustaoğlu
 Yanaz
 Yeğenli
 Yenihamidiye
 Yeniköy
 Yeşilkaya
 Yeşilyurt
 Yukarışeyhler

References

Districts of Bartın Province